Santibanes de la Fuente (Spanish: Santibáñez de la Fuente) is one of 18 parishes (administrative divisions)  in Aller, a municipality within the province and autonomous community of Asturias, in northern Spain. 

Villages
 La Casa la Vega
 Coḷḷanzo
 La Fuente
 Santibanes de la Fuente
 Valdevenero
 Yanos

References

Parishes in Aller